Ar-Raʿinah is a sub-district located in the Shar'ab ar-Rawnah District, Taiz Governorate, Yemen. Ar-Raʿinah had a population of 10,021 according to the 2004 census.

References

Sub-districts in Shar'ab ar-Rawnah District